Brian Cavanaugh is a former ice hockey coach who led Canisius for 23 years before being fired during the 2004-05 season. Though he had established himself over a long tenure with the Golden Griffins, leading them to becoming a Division I program, Cavanaugh was fired by the athletic director in December 2004 due to a slew of complaints from the team. He has since retired as the athletic director at D'Youville College.

Head coaching record

† Cavanaugh was fired mid-season

References

External links

 Brian Cavanaugh's career statistics at Elite Prospects

Living people
Canisius Golden Griffins men's ice hockey coaches
Year of birth missing (living people)
Place of birth missing (living people)
D'Youville Saints athletic directors